The men's 1500 metres at the 2022 World Athletics Indoor Championships took place on 19–20 March 2022.

Results

Heats
Qualification: First 2 in each heat (Q) and the next 4 fastest (q) advance to the Final.
The heats were started at 12:15.

Final
The final was started at 18:35.

References

1500 metres
1500 metres at the World Athletics Indoor Championships